Horacio Ramón Cardozo (born 29 November 1979) is an Argentine footballer. He plays as a central or defensive midfielder.

Club career

Argentina and Greece
He played several years for Estudiantes de la Plata. He has also played for Asteras Tripolis, Nueva Chicago and Quilmes Atlético Club.

In the season of 2007–08, he was one of Asteras' standout players during the club's first season in the top flight. After being one of the top Asteras Tripolis's players many big clubs showed interest to buy him such as Sevilla.

In June 2010, Cardozo almost joined Olympiakos as a free agent after 3 successful years in Tripoli playing for Asteras Tripolis, but the transfer failed due to a disagreement in terms.

In July 2010, Cardozo joined Kavala, abandoning that team the following season.

Colo-Colo
On 24 December 2011, it was reported that Cardozo would be the new central midfielder of Primera División powerhouse club Colo-Colo on a one−year contract.

On 26 December, Cardozo arrived in Chile to sign his contract with the club that would keep him at Macul until January 2013, and alongside Mathías Vidangossy and Miguel Ángel González was officially presented on 2 January. Cardozo also stated that when Kavala was demoted from the Greek Super League, he returned to Argentina for training with Estudiantes de La Plata, saying also that joining Colo-Colo was a dream for him. He made his Primera División debut in a 2–2 draw against Cobresal at El Salvador on 12 February.

On 30 December 2012, according to Terra Chile, the newspaper of El Mercurio ensured that Cardozo and Blanco y Negro reached an agreement for his departure, whence he received US$50.000 as compensation.

Cyprus and return to Greece
Cadozo returned to Europe signing a one-year contract with Apollon Limassol for an undisclosed fee. On 22 May 2013, Apollon Limassol clinched their seventh Cypriot Cup on final after beating cross-town rivals AEL Limassol 2-1 in a thrilling encounter that was decided in extra-time. A goal from substitute Horacio Cardozo and a late penalty from Romeo Surdu saw Apollon prevail at the Tsirion Stadium in the neighbours' first cup final meeting since 1987.
In the summer of 2013, Horacio Cardozo transferred from Apollon Limassol to Ergotelis Heraklion on a free transfer.

On 24 July 2014, he signed a one-year contract with Super League side Kerkyra.

Career statistics

Club

References

External links
 Cardozo at Football Lineups
 Argentine Primera statistics at Fútbol XXI  
 

1979 births
Living people
Sportspeople from Corrientes Province
Argentine footballers
Argentine expatriate footballers
Estudiantes de La Plata footballers
Nueva Chicago footballers
Quilmes Atlético Club footballers
Colo-Colo footballers
Asteras Tripolis F.C. players
Apollon Limassol FC players
Ergotelis F.C. players
Kavala F.C. players
PAE Kerkyra players
Chilean Primera División players
Argentine Primera División players
Super League Greece players
Cypriot First Division players
Expatriate footballers in Chile
Expatriate footballers in Greece
Expatriate footballers in Cyprus
Association football midfielders